Stein Olav Fiskebeck (24 December 1955 – 13 April 2007) was a Norwegian sports shooter. He competed in two events at the 1992 Summer Olympics. He died in a snowmobiling accident in 2007.

References

External links
 

1955 births
2007 deaths
Norwegian male sport shooters
Olympic shooters of Norway
Shooters at the 1992 Summer Olympics
People from Sør-Varanger
Road incident deaths in Russia
Sportspeople from Troms og Finnmark
20th-century Norwegian people